I Was Told There'd Be Cake is a New York Times-bestselling collection of essays by American writer and literary publicist Sloane Crosley.

Reception

Author Jonathan Lethem called Crosley "another mordant and mercurial wit from the realm of Sedaris and Vowell." David Sedaris himself called her writing "sure-footed, observant and relentlessly funny." Kirkus Reviews called it "Witty and entertaining"; the Seattle Times said "this book about nothing is riveting to the very end"; The New York Observer described it as "a funny book, and also a wistful book and a touching book". Elsewhere, the San Francisco Chronicle reviewer noted that while the book featured "sharp, self-effacing humor", the book's style reveals the author as "too clever for her own good" and "not... very, well, nice", though that by the book's end, "we forgive her deceptions".

References

2008 non-fiction books
American essay collections